Daniel Rogers (January 3, 1754 – February 2, 1806) was an American miller and politician from Milford, in Sussex County, Delaware. He was a member of the Federalist Party, who served in the Delaware General Assembly and as Governor of Delaware.

Early life and family
Rogers was born on a farm in Accomack County, Virginia, near Pungoteague, son of James and Patience Rogers. Generations earlier, about 1665, the family came from England to the Virginia Eastern Shore. His first wife was Esther O. (Nutter) Cropper, the wealthy widow of Molton Cropper of Milford, Delaware. Daniel and Esther had five children: James Rogers, Thomas W. Rogers, Elizabeth "Betsey" Rogers, Molton Cropper Rogers and Daniel Nutter Rogers. The family lived at the Causey Mansion in Milford, Delaware, which was named for a subsequent Governor of Delaware who lived there later. After the death of Esther, Daniel Rogers married Nancy Ann Russum, with whom he had seven more children: John Rogers, Samuel Rogers, Clement S. Rogers, Hannah Wise Rogers, William Rogers, Mary Rogers and Henry Rogers. They were members of Christ Episcopal Church in Milford.

Professional and political career
Rogers came to Cedar Creek Hundred, in Sussex County, Delaware about 1775, and acquired a farm there. Following his first marriage in 1778 and his acquisition of the Cropper property, he bought various milling operations in the area, including the Haven Mills which were north of Milford in Kent County. He also bought a brick granary at Argo's Corner and a tavern at Cedar Creek Village.

He was elected to the State House of Representatives for the 1791–92 session and then was elected twice as the Speaker. He served from 1793 until he became Governor of Delaware and was Speaker the entire time. On September 30, 1797 Governor Gunning Bedford Sr. died and Rogers succeeded to the office. He served as governor from that date until January 15, 1799. He returned to the State Senate in 1802 and served two terms until his death which occurred while he was still in office.

Death and legacy
Rogers died at his home in Milford and was buried on his property there, facing the plaza at Causey Avenue and South Walnut Street. In 1917 the state moved his remains to the Odd Fellows Cemetery at Milford.

His oldest son, James Rogers, moved to New Castle, Delaware, and later served as chief justice of the Court of Common Pleas, Attorney General and Secretary of State of Delaware.

There is no known portrait of Daniel Rogers.

References

External links
 Biographical Directory of the Governors of the United States
 Delaware's Governors
 
 The Political Graveyard

Places with more information
 Delaware Historical Society; website; 505 North Market Street, Wilmington, Delaware 19801; (302) 655-7161
 University of Delaware; Library website; 181 South College Avenue, Newark, Delaware 19717; (302) 831–2965

1754 births
1806 deaths
18th-century American Episcopalians
19th-century American Episcopalians
People from Milford, Delaware
American people of English descent
American planters
Delaware Federalists
Members of the Delaware House of Representatives
Delaware state senators
Governors of Delaware
Burials in Kent County, Delaware
Federalist Party state governors of the United States
People from Accomack County, Virginia
People from New Castle, Delaware
People from Sussex County, Delaware
Virginia colonial people